Poiana Mărului is a commune in Brașov County, Transylvania, Romania. It is composed of a single village of the same name.

The commune is located in the central-south part of the county, in a hilly area north of the Piatra Craiului Mountains, on the banks of the river Șercaia.

Natives
Ion Clopoțel (1892–1986), journalist, sociographer, and memoirist.

References

Communes in Brașov County
Localities in Transylvania